La Familia (The Family) is the debut studio album by Colombian singer J Balvin. It was released on October 29, 2013, by Capitol Latin. The album was nominated for Best Urban Music Album and the single "6 AM" for Best Urban Performance and Best Urban Song at the 15th Latin Grammy Awards. The album was reissued on September 14, 2014, as La Familia B Sides, containing three newly recorded songs and three remixes.

Track listing

La Familia B Sides

Charts

Weekly charts

Year-end charts

Certifications

See also
List of certified albums in Romania

References 

2013 albums
Albums produced by Sky Rompiendo
Capitol Latin albums
J Balvin albums
Spanish-language albums